= Face Swap Live =

Mobile app

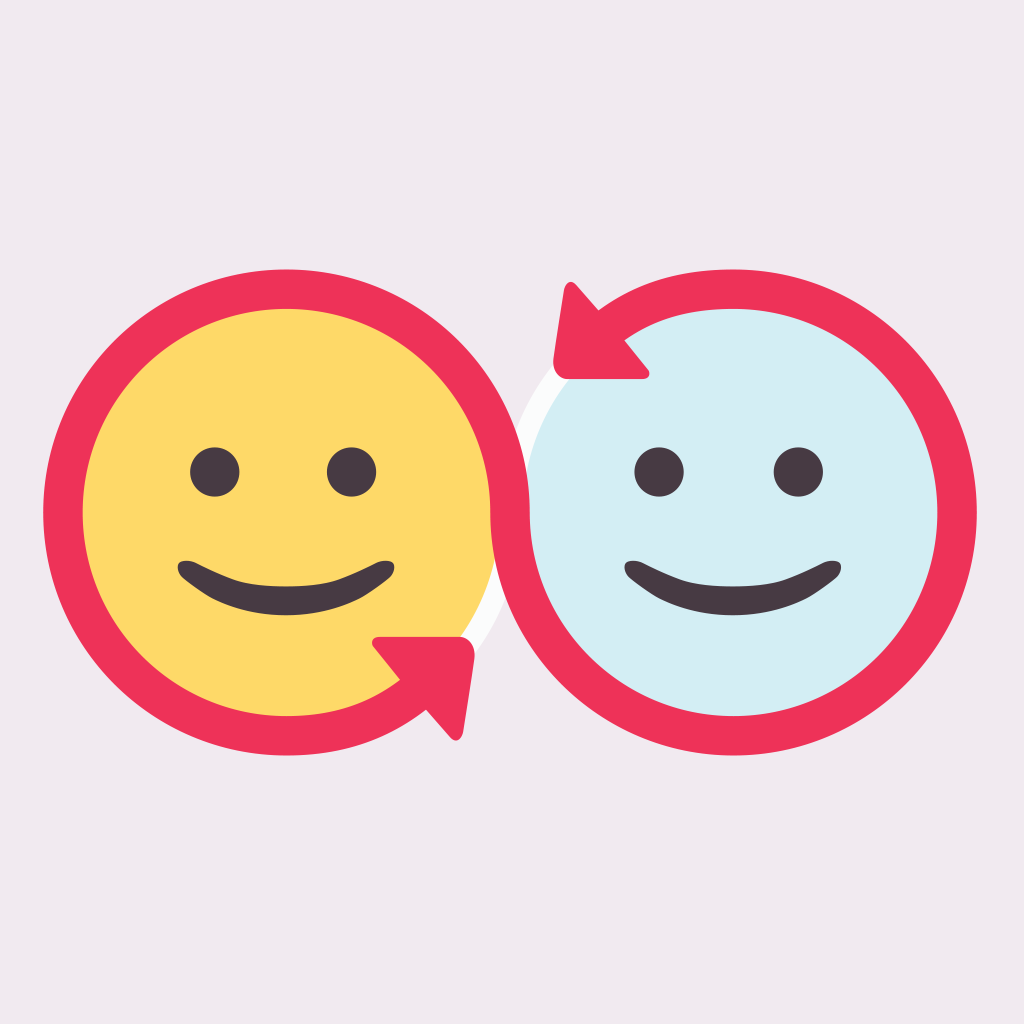
- Developer: Laan Labs
- Release: December 14, 2015
- Operating system: Android & iOS
- Type: Photo Sharing, Video Software
- Website: faceswaplive.com

Face Swap Live is a mobile app created by Laan Labs that enables users to swap faces with another person in real-time using the device's camera. It was released on December 14, 2015. In addition to swapping faces with another person, the app enables users to create videos using a set of bundled live filters.

The app is available on iOS and Android devices. Face Swap Live was named Apple's #2 best-selling paid app in 2016.

== See also ==
- Deepfake
